The following is the list of squads for each of the 16 teams that competed in the men's basketball tournament at the 1968 Summer Olympics.

Group A

Italy

The following players represented Italy:

 Carlo Recalcati
 Enrico Bovone
 Gabriele Vianello
 Gianfranco Lombardi
 Gianluigi Jessi
 Guido Gatti
 Giusto Pellanera
 Massimo Cosmelli
 Massimo Masini
 Ottorino Flaborea
 Paolo Vittori
 Sauro Bufalini

Panama

The following players represented Panama:

 Calixto Malcom
 Davis Peralta
 Eliécer Ellis
 Ernesto Agard
 Francisco Checa
 Julio Osorio
 Luis Sinclair
 Nicolas Alvarado
 Norris Webb
 Pedro Rivas
 Percibal Blades
 Ramón Reyes

Philippines

The following players represented the Philippines:

 Jun Papa
 Alberto Reynoso
 Alfonso Márquez
 Danny Florencio
 Ed Ocampo
 Elias Tolentino
 Jimmy Mariano
 Joaquín Rojas
 Orly Bauzon
 Renato Reyes
 Robert Jaworski
 Rogelio Melencio

Puerto Rico

The following players represented Puerto Rico:

 Adolfo Porrata
 Alberto Zamot
 Ángel Cancel
 Francisco Córdova
 Jaime Frontera
 Mariano Ortiz
 Raymond Dalmau
 Rubén Adorno
 Teo Cruz
 Tomás Gutiérrez
 Bill McCadney
 Joe Hatton

Senegal

The following players represented Senegal:

 Alioune Badara Guèye
 Babacar Seck
 Boubacar Traoré
 Cheikh Amadou Fall
 Claude Constantino
 Claude Sadio
 Doudas Leydi Camara
 Moussa Sène
 Moussa Narou N'Diaye
 Papa Malick Diop
 Babacar Dia
 Mansour Diagne

Spain

The following players represented Spain:

 Alfonso Martínez
 Antonio Nava
 Cliff Luyk
 Emiliano Rodríguez
 Enrique Margall
 Francisco Buscató
 Jesús Codina
 José Sagi-Vela
 Juan Antonio Martínez
 Lorenzo Alocén
 Luis Carlos Santiago
 Vicente Ramos

United States

The following players represented the United States:

 John Clawson
 Ken Spain
 Jo Jo White
 Mike Barrett
 Spencer Haywood
 Charlie Scott
 Bill Hosket Jr.
 Calvin Fowler
 Mike Silliman
 Glynn Saulters
 Jim King
 Don Dee

Yugoslavia

The following players represented Yugoslavia:

Group B

Brazil

The following players represented Brazil:

 Sucar
 Mosquito
 Rosa Branca
 Celso Scarpini
 Hélio Rubens Garcia
 Zé Geraldo
 Edvar Simões
 José Aparecido
 Luiz Menon
 Sérgio Macarrão
 Bira
 Wlamir Marques

Bulgaria

The following players represented Bulgaria:

 Boycho Branzov
 Dimitar Sakhanikov
 Emil Mikhaylov
 Georgi Khristov
 Ivaylo Kirov
 Khristo Doychinov
 Mincho Dimov
 Pando Pandov
 Slavey Raychev
 Stanislav Boyadzhiev
 Stefan Filipov
 Valentin Spasov

Cuba

The following players represented Cuba:

 Carlos del Pozo
 César Valdés
 Conrado Pérez
 Franklin Standard
 Inocente Cuesta
 Jacinto González
 Miguel Calderón
 Miguel Montalvo
 Pablo García
 Pedro Chappé
 Rafael Cañizares
 Ruperto Herrera

Mexico

The following players represented Mexico:

The following players represented Mexico:

Morocco

The following players represented Morocco:

 Abdel Jabbar Bel Gnaoui
 Mohammed Alaoui
 Abdel Wahed Ben Siamar Mimun
 Abderrahmane Sebbar
 Abderraouf Laghrissi
 Allal Bel Caid
 Farouk Dioury
 Fathallah Bouazzaoui
 Khalil El-Yamani
 Moukhtar Sayed
 Moulay Ahmed Riadh
 Noureddine Cherradi

Poland

The following players represented Poland:

 Adam Niemiec
 Andrzej Kasprzak
 Bohdan Likszo
 Bolesław Kwiatkowski
 Czesław Malec
 Edward Jurkiewicz
 Grzegorz Korcz
 Henryk Cegielski
 Kazimierz Frelkiewicz
 Mieczysław Łopatka
 Włodzimierz Trams
 Andrzej Pasiorowski

South Korea

The following players represented South Korea:

 Choi Jong-gyu
 Ha Ui-geon
 Kim In-geon
 Kim Mu-hyeon
 Kim Yeong-il
 Gwak Hyeon-chae
 Lee Byeong-gu
 Lee In-pyo
 Park Han
 Shin Dong-pa
 Yu Hui-hyeong

Soviet Union

The following players represented the Soviet Union:

 Anatoli Krikun
 Modestas Paulauskas
 Zurab Sakandelidze
 Vadim Kapranov
 Yuri Selikhov
 Anatoli Polivoda
 Sergei Belov
 Priit Tomson
 Sergei Kovalenko
 Gennadi Volnov
 Jaak Lipso
 Vladimir Andreyev

References

1968 Summer Olympics